Vincenzo Maria Borg (1773 – 18 July 1837), also known by his nickname Brared (or Braret), was a Maltese merchant who was one of the main insurgent leaders during the French blockade of 1798–1800. He was a lieutenant from 1801 until he was deposed in January 1804.

Life

Ċensu Borg, nicknamed Brared, was born in 1773 in the town of Birkirkara. He was one of the leading cotton merchants in Malta, and was a popular figure on the island. As part of his business, he used to sell products called brared (singular: barrada) and thus originated his nickname.

When the Maltese rebelled against the French occupation in 1798, Brared was chosen by the inhabitants of Birkirkara and Mosta as their leader. He was in charge of the largest battalion among the insurgent army, and became one of the main leaders in the uprising, along with Emmanuele Vitale and Francesco Saverio Caruana. He has financed a number of soldiers throughout the blockade.

Throughout the blockade, capomastri under Brared's command built a number of batteries to bombard French positions and prevent a counterattack, including Għargħar Battery, Ta' Għemmuna Battery and several batteries at Sliema. Brared had his field headquarters at Ta' Xindi Farmhouse, today one of the few surviving landmarks of the blockade.

On 4 February 1799, Brared suggested to Captain Alexander Ball that Malta be placed under British protection, and he hoisted the first British flag on the island. On 2 February 1801, Brared was awarded the gold Pro Patria medal in recognition of his role in the blockade. He became the lieutenant of Birkirkara and Mosta from 1801 to 1804. He quarreled with Ball in January 1804 due to alleged political intrigues, and was placed under house arrest. He was made a knight of the Order of St Michael and St George on 9 February 1833.

Brared died on 18 July 1837, and was buried in the parish church of his hometown Birkirkara.

Further reading
Information about the house of Brared next to St Helen Church.

References

1777 births
1837 deaths
People from Birkirkara
18th-century Maltese businesspeople
19th-century Maltese businesspeople
Maltese rebels
French occupation of Malta
Companions of the Order of St Michael and St George
Maltese businesspeople